Folusz  (Foliush) is a village in the administrative district of Gmina Dębowiec, within Jasło County, Subcarpathian Voivodeship, in south-eastern Poland.

The village has a population of 610.

References

Folusz